The 2000 Los Angeles Dodgers season was the 111th for the franchise in Major League Baseball, and their 43rd season in Los Angeles, California. In 2000, the team set a club record for home runs with 211, led by Gary Sheffield, who tied Duke Snider's single-season club mark with 43. Eric Karros became the L.A. Dodger all-time leader with his 229th home run and Dave Hansen set a Major League record with seven pinch-hit home runs. Kevin Brown led the league in E.R.A. with 2.58 and rookie pitcher Matt Herges started the season 8–0, the first pitcher since Fernando Valenzuela to open the season with eight straight victories. The Dodgers won 86 games, but failed to make the postseason, finishing second in the Western Division of the National League. Manager Davey Johnson was fired after the season and replaced with bench coach Jim Tracy.

Offseason
 November 8, 1999: Acquired Shawn Green and Jorge Nunez from the Toronto Blue Jays for Raúl Mondesí and Pedro Borbón, Jr..
 December 12, 1999: Acquired Terry Adams, Chad Ricketts and Brian Stephenson from the Chicago Cubs for Ismael Valdez and Eric Young.
March 15, 2000: Craig Counsell was released by the Los Angeles Dodgers.
 April 1, 2000: Acquired Kenny Lutz from the Cincinnati Reds for Juan Castro.

Regular season

Season standings

Record vs. opponents

Opening Day lineup

Notable transactions

 June 13, 2000: Acquired Al Reyes from the Baltimore Orioles for Alan Mills.
 June 20, 2000: Acquired Jim Leyritz from the New York Yankees for José Vizcaíno.
 July 26, 2000: Acquired Ismael Valdez from the Chicago Cubs for Jamie Arnold and Jorge Piedra.
 July 31, 2000: Acquired Tom Goodwin from the Colorado Rockies for Todd Hollandsworth, Randey Dorame and Kevin Gibbs.
August 6, 2000: Acquired Bruce Aven from the Pittsburgh Pirates for cash.

Roster

Starting Pitchers stats
Note: G = Games pitched; GS = Games started; IP = Innings pitched; W/L = Wins/Losses; ERA = Earned run average; BB = Walks allowed; SO = Strikeouts; CG = Complete games

Relief Pitchers stats
Note: G = Games pitched; GS = Games started; IP = Innings pitched; W/L = Wins/Losses; ERA = Earned run average; BB = Walks allowed; SO = Strikeouts; SV = Saves

Batting Stats
Note: Pos = Position; G = Games played; AB = At bats; Avg. = Batting average; R = Runs scored; H = Hits; HR = Home runs; RBI = Runs batted in; SB = Stolen bases

2000 Awards
2000 Major League Baseball All-Star Game
Kevin Brown reserve
Gary Sheffield reserve
NL Player of the Week
Gary Sheffield (June 12–18)
Gary Sheffield (July 9–16)
Chan Ho Park (Sep. 18–24)

Farm system

Major League Baseball Draft

The Dodgers selected 50 players in this draft. Of those, eight of them would eventually play Major League baseball.

The first round pick was right-handed pitcher Ben Diggins from the University of Arizona. He was traded to the Milwaukee Brewers in 2002 and appeared in five games with them as a starting pitcher that season with an 0–4 record and an 8.63 ERA. Those would be the only Major League games he would appear in as he was out of baseball after a few more years in the minors.

The second round pick, pitcher Joel Hanrahan from Norwalk High School would be the only moderately successful player in this draft class. He became a two-time All-Star as a relief pitcher with the Pittsburgh Pirates. Catcher Koyie Hill (round 4) would catch on as a backup catcher for several teams, most notably the Chicago Cubs.

References

External links 
2000 Los Angeles Dodgers uniform
Los Angeles Dodgers official web site
Baseball-Reference season page
Baseball Almanac season page

Los Angeles Dodgers seasons
Los Angeles Dodgers
Los Angeles Dodgers season